John Douglas Collins (born 28 August 1945) is an English former professional footballer who played as a midfielder. In 1979, he had a short spell as player-manager of Rochdale.

External links
 

1945 births
Living people
English footballers
English football managers
Association football midfielders
Grimsby Town F.C. players
Burnley F.C. players
Plymouth Argyle F.C. players
Sunderland A.F.C. players
Tulsa Roughnecks (1978–1984) players
Rochdale A.F.C. players
Rochdale A.F.C. managers
English Football League players
English Football League managers
North American Soccer League (1968–1984) players
English expatriate sportspeople in the United States
Expatriate soccer players in the United States
English expatriate footballers